The Age of Steam Roundhouse Museum, Sugarcreek, Ohio, United States, is a museum roundhouse housing steam and diesel locomotives, passenger cars and other railroad equipment.

History
The roundhouse was built by Jerry Joe Jacobson, former CEO of the Ohio Central Railroad System (OCRS). In October 2008, Jacobson sold his interest in OCRS to Genesee & Wyoming, including the track, modern equipment, and most of the workshops and depots. Jacobson kept a collection of vintage steam and diesel locomotives, other old equipment, and a depot at Sugarcreek, Ohio. He bought 34 acres in Sugarcreek and began constructing a roundhouse to house his collection. The roundhouse building was completed in 2011 and all of the steam locomotives, along with a few other select pieces of rolling stock in Jacobson's collection, were moved inside the roundhouse that same year. It was the "first large roundhouse built in the United States since 1951," with the previous building being Nickel Plate Road's roundhouse in its Calumet Yard. As of 2012, the Age of Steam Roundhouse's website outlines its goals as:

 Preserve the steam locomotives, historic diesels, passenger cars, and other railroad relics in the collection of Jerry Joe Jacobson.
 Build a full-scale, operating, and realistic roundhouse and back shop to overhaul, repair, and maintain Jerry’s rolling stock.
 Operate the steam locomotives on freight trains.
 Display railroad heritage for future generations.

The project was paid for by Jacobson and his wife, Laura. They set up an endowment to support the museum. Architect F. A. Goodman says the building is 48,000 square feet and of "solid masonry walls" and "heavy timber framing". It has 18 stalls, each of which is large enough for a locomotive and its tender. The Goodman company says the roundhouse is one of the largest heavy timber structures in America.

Steam locomotives

Diesel locomotives

ALCO

EMD

Fairbanks-Morse

General Electric

See also

List of heritage railroads in the United States
Ohio Central Railroad System

References

External links

Official website

Buildings and structures in Tuscarawas County, Ohio
Heritage railroads in Ohio
Rail transportation preservation in the United States
Railroad roundhouses in Ohio